Nobody's Life is a 2002 Spanish film directed by  which stars José Coronado and Adriana Ozores alongside Roberto Álvarez, Marta Etura and Adrián Portugal.

The plot sweetens the real-life story of Jean-Claude Romand, otherwise also fictionalised in Time Out (2001), and The Adversary (2002).

Plot 
The plot is inspired by the story of Jean-Claude Romand. It is set in bourgeois neighborhood in Madrid. Emilio Barrero holds a seemingly successful life that is nothing but a lie. The farce begins to crumble upon his infatuation with a young female student, Rosana.

Cast

Production 
The film is a Pedro Costa PC and Enrique Cerezo PC production.

Release 
The film premiered at the 47th Valladolid International Film Festival in October 2002. It received a theatrical release in Spain on 21 February 2003.

Reception 
Ángel Fernández-Santos of El País pointed out that Cortés "dodges the brutal and bloodthirsty side" of the original subject, delivering a film "that borders on blandness but avoids it with cleverness and ease", also highlighting Ozores' "masterful" performance as a cheated wife.

Mirito Torreiro of Fotogramas rated the film 3 out of 5 stars highlighting the Ozores vs. Coronado acting duel as the best thing about the film, while citing "a cowardly and predictable ending" as the worst thing about it.

Accolades 

|-
| align = "center" | 2002 || 47th Valladolid International Film Festival || Best Actress || Adriana Ozores ||  || 
|-
| align = "center" rowspan = "3" | 2003 || rowspan = "3" | 17th Goya Awards || Best New Director || Eduard Cortés ||  || rowspan = "3" | 
|-
| Best Actress || Adriana Ozores || 
|-
| Best New Actress || Marta Etura || 
|}

See also 
 List of Spanish films of 2003

References 

Films set in Madrid
2002 drama films
2000s Spanish-language films
Enrique Cerezo PC films
2000s Spanish films